Allocota viridipennis is a species of either brownish-green or reddish-blue  coloured ground beetle in the Lebiinae subfamily that can be found in such Indonesian islands as Borneo, Java and Sumatra.

References

Beetles described in 1859
Beetles of Asia